The Honorary Fellows of St Peter's College, Oxford include:

 The Rt Hon Lord Hodgson of Astley Abbotts
 Professor Caroline Barron OBE
 Professor Graham Bell FRS FRSC
 Sir Kenneth Bloomfield KCB
 Dame Frances Cairncross DBE, FRSE, FAcSS
 Mark Carney
 The Rt Hon Lord Condon of Langton Green
 Mark Damazer CBE
 Sir Lloyd Dorfman CBE
 Sir Gordon Duff, FRCP, FMedSci, FRSE
 Sir David Stephen Eastwood, DL, FRHistS
 The Revd Professor Paul Stuart Fiddes, FBA
 Professor Sir Charles Godfray CBE FRS
 The Rt Hon Lord Houghton of Richmond
 Kurt Jackson
 Sir Robert Raphael Hayim "Robin" Jacob, PC
 Dr Herwig Kogelnik
 The Rt Revd Libby Lane
 Lang Lang
 Sir George Anthony Mann
 Andrew Marr
 Sir David John Moxon KNZM CStJ
 François Perrodo
 The Rt Revd John Pritchard
 Admiral Sir Mark Stanhope, GCB, OBE, ADC, DL
 Sir Nigel John Martin Teare
 Professor Daniel Woolf FRHistS FSA FRSC

References

St Peter's College
People associated with St Peter's College, Oxford